Milberger is an unincorporated community in Lincoln Township, Russell County, Kansas, United States.  It is located about 10.5 miles south of Russell and 3.5 miles west of U.S. Route 281 on Michaelis Rd.

History
Volga German colonists founded Milberger in 1884. Predominantly Lutheran, they established several churches in and around the community, most of which closed by 1980. A rural post office operated in Milberger from 1903 to 1911.

Geography
Milberger is located at  (38.7119562, -98.9123098) at an elevation of 1,857 feet (566 m). It lies on the west side of Landon Creek roughly 4.5 miles (7 km) south of the Smoky Hill River in the Smoky Hills region of the Great Plains. Milberger is approximately 3.5 miles (6 km) west of U.S. Route 281, 10.5 miles (17 km) south of Interstate 70, and 12 miles (20 km) south-southwest of Russell, the county seat.

Economy
 Radke Implement

Education
The community is served by Russell County USD 407 public school district.

Transportation
Milberger lies at the intersection of 182nd Street, a paved county road which runs north–south, and Michaelis Road, an unpaved county road which runs east–west.

References

Further reading

External links
 Russell County maps: Current, Historic, KDOT

German-Russian culture in Kansas
Unincorporated communities in Russell County, Kansas
Unincorporated communities in Kansas
Populated places established in 1884
1884 establishments in Kansas